Trickside was an American pop duo from New York City.

History
Trickside was composed of brothers Jeff Mendelsohn and Dave Mendelsohn of New York City. The name "Trickside" came from a childhood playing card game. The band's single "Under You" was included on the soundtrack to the film On the Line, and reached #27 on the Billboard Adult Top 40 charts. Marcos Siega shot the music video for the song.

Discography
Trickside (Wind-Up Records, 2001)

References

Musical groups from New York City
American pop music groups